The Sangli-Miraj-Kupwad Municipal Corporation is the governing body of the city of Sangli in the Indian state of south Maharashtra. It is located in Sangli. The municipal corporation consists of democratically elected members, is headed by a mayor and administers the city's infrastructure and public services. It was founded on 9 February 1998. Sangli municipal corporation serves an area approximately 118.18 km2 and provides civil services & facilities for above 6.5 lakhs population. Sangali-Miraj-Kupwad Municipal Corporation Municipal Corporation has been formed with functions to improve the infrastructure of town.

Revenue sources 

The following are the Income sources for the corporation from the Central and State Government.

Revenue from taxes 
Following is the Tax related revenue for the corporation.

 Property tax.
 Profession tax.
 Entertainment tax.
 Grants from Central and State Government like Goods and Services Tax.
 Advertisement tax.

Revenue from non-tax sources 

Following is the Non Tax related revenue for the corporation.

 Water usage charges.
 Fees from Documentation services.
 Rent received from municipal property.
 Funds from municipal bonds.

List of Mayor

List of Deputy Mayor

List of Chairman, Standing Committee

Municipal elections

Elections 2018 
Municipal Elections were held on 3 August 2018 to elect a total of 78 councillors in 38 wards. The BJP won an absolute majority in the 2018 elections, marking the first time the city got a mayor from the party.Sangita Khot (BJP) was elected as the mayor and Dhiraj Suryawanshi (BJP) as the deputy mayor.

Bypolls 2021 
2021 mayor and deputy mayor elections, the NCP, Congress and the Shivsena together defeate the BJP. this election, Digvijay Suryawanshi (NCP) was elected as the Mayor and Umesh Patil (INC) as the Deputy Mayor. In this election, some of the BJP corporators changed their party and they had to face this defeat.

Taxes in Sangli 
Sangli municipal corporation has recently added a new tax as a substitute for Octroi i.e. Local Body Tax from 25 September 2013

References

External links 
  of SMKC

Jalgaon
Municipal corporations in Maharashtra
1998 establishments in Maharashtra